Live in Black is the second double CD/DVD live album by Norwegian singer Jørn Lande's solo band Jorn.
It was recorded at the 2010 Sweden Rock Festival on 10 June. The setlist features mostly songs from Jorn previous last two studio albums Lonely Are The Brave and Spirit Black as well as some setlist regular songs featured on the albums The Duke and Worldchanger.

Track list

Bonus DVD Material
 "Song for Ronnie James (videoclip)"
 "Man of the Dark (videoclip)"

Personnel
 Jørn Lande - lead vocals
 Tore Moren - guitar
 Tor Erik Myhre - guitar 
 Nic Anglieri - bass 
 Willy Bendiksen - drums

Production
 Mixing and mastering by Tommy Hansen

External links
 Neh Records

Jørn Lande albums
2011 live albums
Frontiers Records albums